Saber Abar (born June 8, 1984) is an Iranian actor, director and writer. He is best known for his performance in About Elly (2008), directed by Academy Award-winning Asghar Farhadi. He has received various accolades, including two Iran Cinema Celebration Awards and an Iran's Film Critics and Writers Association Award, in addition to nominations for two Crystal Simorghs and two Hafez Awards.

Career

Acting career
Abar began his career hosting television shows such as Rainbow, a children's TV show, and a game show called In 100 Seconds'''. He later gained recognition with his role in Mohsen Makhmalbaf's Sha'ere Zobale.  In 2006, he starred alongside Ezzatollah Entezami in Minaye Shahr-e Khamush as a driver and that role earned him a Crystal Simorgh Prize Nomination for Best Supporting Actor. Abar's talent did not go unnoticed in Dayere Zangi (2007), as he then was offered a role in Asghar Farhadi's About Elly. The movie received positive reviews, such as the review from David Bordwell, who called it a masterpiece. Abar played "Alireza", whose fiancée goes missing. The role earned him another nomination in the Fajr International Film Festival.

Saber has also starred in Hich (2009), Nokhodi (2009), Thirteen 59 (2010) and Entehaye Khiabane Hashtom (2010) and had a cameo appearance in Ayene-haye Ruberu (2010).

He plays the main role in The Frog.

Theatre career
Abar has starred alongside the likes of Farhad Aeesh, Mehdi Hashemi and Shahab Hosseini in Kargadan (2008), directed by Farhad Aeesh. He has also starred in Dastan-e yek Pellekan (2009), directed by Reza Guran, Caligula (2010), directed by Homayoun Ghanizadeh, and Jire-bandie pare Khorus baraye Sugvari (2011), directed by Ali Narges Nejad. In 2010, Saber directed the play Vav-ha va Virgul-ha.

Writing 
Abar wrote a bilingual book, "To Seven Houses Away," about Iranian grandmothers across the country of Iran, published by Inja, Middle Of The Town (اینجا میان شهر) in Tehran.

Filmography

Film

Web

Awards and nominations

References

External links

 
 
Saber Abar at Iranian Movie Database

Living people
21st-century Iranian male actors
1984 births
Male actors from Tehran
Iranian film directors
Iranian male film actors
Iranian male stage actors